Guðni Runar Helgason (born 16 July 1976) is a retired Icelandic football midfielder.

References

1976 births
Living people
Gudni Runar Helgason
Gudni Runar Helgason
SG Wattenscheid 09 players
Hønefoss BK players
Gudni Runar Helgason
IK Start players
Gudni Runar Helgason
Gudni Runar Helgason
2. Bundesliga players
Norwegian First Division players
Eliteserien players
Association football midfielders
Gudni Runar Helgason
Expatriate footballers in England
Gudni Runar Helgason
Expatriate footballers in Germany
Gudni Runar Helgason
Expatriate footballers in Norway
Gudni Runar Helgason